Orna Villa, also known as the Alexander Means House and the Means/Tanner House, is a historic Greek Revival house located on Emory Street in Oxford, Georgia.  Built in 1825, it is the oldest house in Oxford. The house is a work of Richard K. Dearing.

The home was owned for a time by Alexander Means, a founder and president of Emory College (the original site of which is now Oxford College of Emory University) and was used as a hospital during the American Civil War.  The house has been featured in works on haunted houses because of its alleged association with the ghost of Tobe Means. The house was listed on the National Register of Historic Places (NRHP) in 1973. Orna Villa was the location of a college frat party in The Vampire Diaries.

It is a contributing building within the Oxford Historic District which also is NRHP-listed.

References

External links 

 Stuart A. Rose Manuscript, Archives, and Rare Book Library, Emory University: Alexander Means papers, 1824-1963

Houses on the National Register of Historic Places in Georgia (U.S. state)
Greek Revival houses in Georgia (U.S. state)
Houses completed in 1825
Houses in Newton County, Georgia
National Register of Historic Places in Newton County, Georgia